Bruce Carlson may refer to:

Bruce A. Carlson (born 1949), United States Air Force general 
Bruce Carlson (composer) (born 1944), Canadian composer
Bruce A. Carlson (zoologist)